Urman is a rural locality (a village) in Bakalinsky Selsoviet, Bakalinsky District, Bashkortostan, Russia. The population was 296 as of 2010. There is 1 street.

Geography 
Urman is located 4 km southeast of Bakaly (the district's administrative centre) by road. Plodoyagodnaya is the nearest rural locality.

References 

Rural localities in Bakalinsky District